The Royal Corps of Army Music (RCAM, widely known by its former acronym CAMUS) is a Corps of the British Army dedicated to the provision and promotion of military music.

History
The formation of the Corps of Army Music was triggered by a defence review known as Options for Change in 1991 and followed a 1993 announcement by the Chief of the General Staff that the number of regular army bands was to be reduced from 69 to 30. The period saw the number of personnel fall from 2,000 to 1,100, with Lieutenant Colonel Roger Tomlinson of the Royal Military School of Music describing it as "a gloomy time for those of us in the military music business". The Queen signed a warrant on 13 August 1994 to allow the formation of the Corps of Army Music. All regular army officers who were Directors of Music in the various corps and regiments and all regular army musicians would transfer to the Corps of Army Music - now the newest and most junior corps in the army - on 1 September 1994.

The home of the corps was established at Kneller Hall in Twickenham, a site that already encompassed the Royal Military School of Music. The school was founded by the Duke of Cambridge, soon after his appointment as Commander in Chief in 1857, when the first class of military musicians was formed, a 'Class of Music'. The establishment was retitled as The Royal Military School of Music by Queen Victoria in 1887.

The Future Army Structures review of 2004 saw the bands of the Regular Army reduced from 30 to 23. In 2019 the number of Regular Army bands was further reduced to 14.

2019 restructuring
In 2019 the Corps of Army Music was restructured with a number of bands being co-located and re-named. In a process of 'Military Music Optimization', the regular Army band laydown was adjusted to enable several smaller bands to train and perform as larger bands for more significant Army events: 'Co-locating 11 of the smaller bands in three major garrisons and Sandhurst has increased the flexibility of CAMUS to perform at a huge breadth of events without compromising any of the traditional bands that have been performing for many years'.

Renaming and move
During a visit to Kneller Hall in December 2020, the Earl and Countess of Wessex announced the Corps of Army Music would be renamed the Royal Corps of Army Music from January 2021. This change was formally marked with a new title presentation in January 2021 with the Countess in attendance.

In September 2021, the Corps Headquarters moved to Gibraltar Barracks in Minley, whilst the Royal Military School of Music moved to HMS Nelson alongside the Royal Marines School of Music.

Bands of the Corps 
The 14 constituent bands of the Corps are as follows:

Band of the Household Cavalry, at Combermere Barracks, Windsor
Band of the Grenadier Guards, at Wellington Barracks, Westminster, London
Band of the Coldstream Guards, at Wellington Barracks, Westminster, London
Band of the Scots Guards, at Wellington Barracks, Westminster, London
Band of the Irish Guards, at Wellington Barracks, Westminster, London
Band of the Welsh Guards, at Wellington Barracks, Westminster, London
Band of the Royal Regiment of Scotland, at Dreghorn Barracks, Edinburgh
Band and Bugles of The Rifles, at Worthy Down Barracks, Winchester
Countess of Wessex's String Orchestra, at Royal Artillery Barracks, Woolwich Station, London
British Army Band Catterick, at Piave Lines, Catterick Garrison 
Band of the Royal Armoured Corps
Band of the King's Division
Band of the Royal Electrical and Mechanical Engineers
British Army Band Tidworth, at Lucknow Barracks, Tidworth Camp
Royal Artillery Band
Band of the Royal Engineers
Band of the Adjutant General's Corps
British Army Band Sandhurst, at the Royal Military Academy Sandhurst, Camberley
Band of the Royal Corps of Signals
Band of the Royal Logistic Corps
British Army Band Colchester, at Merville Barracks, Colchester Garrison
Band of the Queen's Division (originally disbanded in 2018)
Band of the Parachute Regiment
Band of the Army Air Corps
Band of the Prince of Wales, at Brecon

In addition to providing personnel for all the above bands, the Corps of Army Music provides 'technical support' for the Band of the Brigade of Gurkhas, based at Shorncliffe Camp, Folkestone, which is separately constituted. Other bands may be formed from time to time by drawing together personnel from different ensembles; for example the British Army Brass Band (founded by two Army Bandmasters in 2007) is 'made up of players across all bands of the Army, Regulars and Reservists'.

Army Reserve Bands
All Army Reserve bands report to their respective regimental/battalion headquarters and provide around 30% of all the Army's musical output.  The current Army Reserve bands as of April 2021 are as follows:

 Band of the Honourable Artillery Company
Band of the Royal Yeomanry (Inns of Court and City Yeomanry)
 Lancashire Artillery Volunteers Band
 The Nottinghamshire Band of the Royal Engineers
 The (Northern) Band of the Royal Corps of Signals
Lowland Band of the Royal Regiment of Scotland
 Highland Band of the Royal Regiment of Scotland
 Band of the Princess of Wales's Royal Regiment (Queen's and Royal Hampshires)
 Band of the Royal Regiment of Fusiliers
 Band of the Royal Anglian Regiment
 Volunteer Band of the Royal Gibraltar Regiment
 Band of The Royal Irish Regiment (27th (Inniskilling) 83rd and 87th and Ulster Defence Regiment)
 Band of the Royal Welsh - The only Brass Band in the Army Reserve
 Band of the Duke of Lancaster's Regiment (King's Lancashire and Border)
 Band of the Yorkshire Regiment (14th/15th, 19th & 33rd/76th Foot)
 The Band of The Mercian Regiment
 The Salamanca Band of The Rifles
 The Waterloo Band of The Rifles
 Band of 150th (Yorkshire) Regiment, Royal Logistic Corps
 Band of the Army Medical Services

Army Volunteer Bands
All Army Volunteer Bands serve in a voluntary capacity and have no army reserves commitment but still perform for various mess functions, church parades and civic functions, supporting their regiment and the wider regimental family. The uniform worn is that of the regular regiment which is headquartered in the Tower of London.

 The Band and Drum Corps of the Royal Regiment of Fusiliers (Lancashire)
 The Band of the Royal Regiment of Fusiliers (Warwickshire)

Order of precedence

Footnotes

References

External links

 Corps of Army Music - on British Army official website

 
British administrative corps
Musical groups established in 1994
Military units and formations established in 1994
1994 establishments in British Overseas Territories